Horace Robert Fletcher (1876 – September 1931), known as either Horace or Robert Fletcher, was an English footballer who scored 6 goals from 28 appearances in the Football League playing for Lincoln City as an inside left. He played in the Midland League for Mexborough, and also played non-league football for Rotherham Town.

References

1876 births
1931 deaths
Footballers from Rotherham
English footballers
Association football inside forwards
Mexborough F.C. players
Lincoln City F.C. players
Rotherham Town F.C. (1899) players
Midland Football League players
English Football League players
Date of birth missing